Ranjangaon Ganpati is one among the Ashtavinayak, celebrating eight instances of legends related to Ganesha.  This temple's Ganpati idol was inaugurated and donated by the "Khollam" family, a goldsmith family based in Ranjangaon. The temple was built between the 9th and 10th century. The main temple looks like it was built in the Peshwa period. Nagarkhana is situated above the entrance gate. The temple facing east has huge and beautiful entrance gate. 

Madhavrao  Peshwa  made a room in the basement of the temple to keep the idol of lord Ganesh. Later on Sardar Kibe of Indore renovated it. The idol of these lord Ganesh is also named as 'Mahotkat', and it is said that the idol has 10 trunks and 20 hands.

While going from the Pune - Nagar highway the route is Pune - Koregaon - then via Shikrapur; Rajangaon is 21 km before Shirur. From Pune it is 50 km.

In early 1990s, Govt of Maharashtra established an industrial zone (MIDC) on the land acquired from the nearby villages and the industrial establishment is known as Ranjangaon MIDC. It host many multinational manufacturing companies like Whirlpool, LG to name a few.

References 

 

Ganesha temples
Hindu temples in Pune district